The Search for Modern China is a 1990 non-fiction book by Jonathan Spence, published by Century Hutchinson and W. W. Norton & Company.

It covers the period 1600 to 1989. According to Spence, the goal was to explain how Modern China was created rather than writing about Modern China directly. Spence stated that he chose 1600 as the starting point so he could "get a full sense of how China's current problems have arisen, and of what resources[...]the Chinese can call upon to solve them."

Theresa Munford in Far Eastern Economic Review, described it as "more of a textbook" than The Gate of Heavenly Peace, which she described as lighter reading.

Contents
The total page count is 876.

There is one further reading list per chapter, and the book has some footnotes. She stated the items of photography "are refreshingly different from the ones that are normally reproduced in Chinese history books", "especially the black and white" ones. There are 49 maps and 49 tables.

Very little hanzi are in the book. According to Munford, the ones there "are so poorly printed as to hardly be legible."

Frank Ching stated "This is by no means a book that can be read in one sitting."

Reception
George Jochnowitz of National Review wrote that the book had been "highly praised"; Jochnowitz added that he felt this was "deservedly so", citing the "relaxed and natural style" and "fascinating information".

Munford praised how the book is "well-designed".

Vera Schwarcz of The New York Times wrote that the book was "excellent" and praised its "thematic focus", "wealth of illustrations", and "narrative technique" that she stated were not present in other books.

Frank Ching stated that of Spence's works, this was "the most ambitious".

Arif Dirlik described the book's writing style as an "easy fluency that makes it accessible to the nonspecialist reader."

References

Notes

Further reading

External links
 The Search for Modern China
 

1990 books
Books about China